Dark matter is a term in physics used to refer to matter that is undetectable by its emitted radiation, but whose presence can be inferred from gravitational effects.

Dark Matter(s) or Darkmatter may also refer to:

Science 

 Biological dark matter, unclassified or poorly understood genetic material
 Dark matter (economics)

Books 
 Dark Matter (Reeves-Stevens novel), a 1990 novel by Garfield Reeves-Stevens
 Dark Matter (Zeh novel), a 2007 novel by Juli Zeh
 Dark Matter (Paver novel), a 2010 novel by Michelle Paver
 Dark Matter (Crouch novel), a 2016 novel by Blake Crouch
 Dark Matter (prose anthologies), an anthology series of science fiction, fantasy, and horror by writers of African descent
 Dark Matter (comics), a comic book series

Film, radio, and television 
 Dark Matter (film), a 2007 film by Chen Shi-zheng
 "Dark Matter", a 2019 episode of Dark
 "Dark Matter" (Numb3rs), a 2005 episode of Numb3rs
 Dark Matter (2015 TV series), a space television series based on the comic book series
 Dark Matter (upcoming TV series), upcoming science fiction television series
 "Dark Matters" (The Outer Limits), a 1995 episode of The Outer Limits
 Dark Matters, a 2015 web television series, prelude for 2015 television series Heroes Reborn
 Dark Matters: Twisted But True, a 2011 Science Channel television series
 Art Bell's Dark Matter, an American radio talk show on Sirius XM Radio
 Warp Darkmatter, a character in the animated series Buzz Lightyear of Star Command

Games 
 Dark•Matter, a role-playing game campaign setting
 Dark Matter (video game), a 2013 indie metroidvania/survival horror video game
 DarkMatter (programming), a collection of 3D models by The Game Creators
 Dark Matter (Kirby), a recurring antagonist in the Kirby video-game series
 Kakine Teitoku, known as Dark Matter, a character in the Japanese light novel series A Certain Magical Index

Music 
 Dark Matter (IQ album), 2004
 Dark Matter (Brett Garsed album), 2011
 Dark Matter (The Word Alive album), 2016
 Dark Matter (Randy Newman album), 2017
 Dark Matter, an album by Les Friction, 2017
 Dark Matters (The Rasmus album), 2017
 Dark Matter (Moses Boyd album), 2020
 Dark Matter (CamelPhat album), 2020
 Dark Matters (The Stranglers album), 2021
 Emre (Dark Matter), an experimental music compilation album
 Dark Matters, a concept album by Devin Townsend, released as the second part of Z²
 "Darkmatter", a song by Andrew Bird from Armchair Apocrypha
 "Dark Matter", a song by Porcupine Tree from Signify
 "Dark Matter", a song by Björk from Biophilia
 "Dark Matter", a song by The Crüxshadows from As the Dark Against My Halo

Art
 DarkMatter (spoken word), queer South Asian artists

Organizations
 DarkMatter (Emirati company), a technology company from the UAE